A custodian bank, or simply custodian, is a specialized financial institution responsible for providing securities services. It safeguards assets of asset managers, insurance companies, hedge funds, and is not engaged in "traditional" commercial or consumer/retail banking like lending. The role of a custodian in such a case would be to:

 hold in safekeeping assets/securities such as stocks, bonds, commodities such as precious metals and currency (cash), domestic and foreign
 arrange settlement of any purchases and sales and deliveries in/out of such securities and currency
 collect information on and income from such assets (dividends in the case of stocks/equities and coupons (interest payments) in the case of bonds) and administer related tax withholding documents and foreign tax reclamation
 administer voluntary and involuntary corporate actions on securities held such as stock dividends, stock splits, business combinations (mergers), tender offers, bond calls, etc.
 provide information on the securities and their issuers such as annual general meetings and related proxies
 maintain currency/cash bank accounts, effect deposits and withdrawals and manage other cash transactions
 perform foreign exchange transactions
 often perform additional services for particular clients such as mutual funds; examples include fund accounting, administration, legal, compliance and tax support services

Using US definitions, a person who owns street name securities and who is not a member of an exchange, holds the securities through a registration chain which involves one or more custodians. This is due to the perceived impracticality of registering traded securities in the name of each individual holder; instead, the custodian or custodians are registered as the holders and hold the securities in a fiduciary arrangement for the ultimate security holders. However, the ultimate security holders are still the legal owners of the securities. They are not merely beneficiaries of the custodian as a trustee. The custodian does not become at any point the owner of the securities, but is only a part of the registration chain linking the owners to the securities.
Global securities safekeeping practices vary substantially with markets such as the UK, Australia and South Africa encouraging designated securities accounts in order to permit shareholder identification by companies.

The definition of "shareholder" is generally upheld by corporate law rather than securities law. One role of custodians (which may or may not be enforced by securities regulation) is to facilitate the exercise of share ownership rights, for example and processing dividends and other payments, corporate actions, the proceeds of a stock split or a reverse stock split, the ability to vote in the company's annual general meeting (AGM), information and reports sent from the company and so forth. The extent to which such services are offered are a function of the client agreement together with relevant market rules, regulations and laws.

Custodian banks are often referred to as global custodians if they safe keep assets for their clients in multiple jurisdictions around the world, using their own local branches or other local custodian banks ("sub-custodian" or "agent banks") with which they contract to be in their "global network" in each market to hold accounts for their respective clients. Assets held in such a manner are typically owned by larger institutional firms with a considerable number of investments such as banks, insurance companies, mutual funds, hedge funds and pension funds.

History

Early History
In 1961, U.S. President John F. Kennedy established a Committee on Corporate Pension Plans. 2 years later, Studebaker Auto Manufacturer, shuttered its business and operations, and it failed to provide pensions to the affected approximately 7,000 employees. Hence, in 1974, U.S. President Gerald Ford proposed an Employee Retirement Income Security Act (ERISA Act), protecting the employee benefit plans' standards.

Since the Act has become effective, employers could not hold and keep their pension fund assets. Instead, they are obligated to appoint external custodians to safekeep the assets. Also, they are required to appoint trustees and depositories to ensure the pension funds are operated in the best interest of the pension holders and aligned to the investment mandates.

Further Developments
And now, more banks have developed a wealth range of custody and related services (securities services), and have been keen on developing new technologies (e.g. blockchain, API, distributed ledger) and aligning with the fast-moving regulatory requirement, such as digital assets.

Client Segments & Products
The securities services industry mainly serves two types of clients: 1) Asset Owners & Managers and 2) Banks, Brokers & Dealers.

Asset Owners & Managers
For the client segment of Asset Owners & Managers, it includes asset management companies, alternative asset managers, insurance companies, pension funds, sovereign wealth funds, central banks, family offices and prime brokers.

The bank may offer products & services below:
Global Custody
Fund Administration: Fund accounting and valuation services across different fund types and structures by using the bank's integrated fund accounting platform. For example, offering Net asset value (NAV) and portfolio holding etc. reports and financial reporting support. Usually, ETF services also fall under the scope of fund admin.
Transfer Agency
Collateral Management & Segregation: Collateral management is the management of collateral. Banks can optimize financial institutions’ collateral portfolios with internal analysis tools and flexible two-way/three-way solutions. A number of global banks can make better use of their global capabilities to help FI manage one-stop global or onshore collateral, and meet complex financing and liquidity needs.
Middle Office Outsourcing
Securities Lending & Borrowing
Treasury Products (Cash Management & FX)
Trustee Services

Banks, Brokers & Dealers
The client segment of Banks, Brokers & Dealers includes global custodians, banks, brokers and dealers.

The bank may offer products & services below:
Direct Custody & Clearing
Third Party Clearing
Account Operators

Global Custody & Direct Custody

Global Custody
A global custodian is responsible for the safekeeping and administration of assets of clients, for instance, asset managers & owners, in multiple markets. They serve as the first point of contact for their global clients. However, they may not have such a strong network in every jurisdictions in which the clients want to invest. Therefore, the global custodian needs to appoint and manage direct custodians which have existing securities services infrastructure in some individual markets.

Direct Custody
A Direct custodian offers custody services in their local markets. Global custodians are their focused clients as direct custodians can offer knowledge and experience of the markets and industry and, close relationships with the local regulators in the local market, which the global custodian might lack but require. Therefore, it is responsible for the safekeeping and administration of assets of clients, for instance, asset managers & owners, in a local market.

Industry Profile

Industry Size
As of 2022, the market size (as measured by revenue) of the Custody, Asset & Securities Services industry in the US is $32.5bn, with a YoY 2.9% growth between 2017 and 2022.

Industry Players
Plenty of investment banks and banks offer securities services. Generally, the division of securities services is either grouped with Global Markets to form a larger umbrella of Markets & Securities Services (MSS) or falls under the umbrella of Corporate Banking or Transaction Banking.

For instance, Citi and HSBC restructured and combined their Global Markets and Securities Services divisions in 2019 and 2020 respectively.

Players include but not limited to (according to alphabetical order):

 BNP Paribas: Securities Services
 BNY Mellon: Securities Services
 Citi: Markets & Securities Services
 Crédit Agricole/Santander: CACEIS Investor Services
 Deutsche Bank: Corporate Banking
 HSBC: Markets & Securities Services
 J.P. Morgan: Markets & Securities Services
 Mizuho: Institutional Services
 MUFG: Investor Services
 Northern Trust: Asset Servicing
 Royal Bank of Canada: Investor & Treasury Services
 SMBC: Custody and Securities Services
 Société Générale: Global Markets and Investor Services
 Standard Chartered: Financial Markets
 State Street: Asset Servicing

Industry Ranking

Global
In accordance Asset under Custody League Table  by Global Custodian, custodian banks' assets under custody and/or administration (AUC/AUA) are:

′ Assets under custody only

Regional
According to the Global Custody Survey 2020 by Global Investor Group, the top custody regional players are:

Notable Industry Acquisitions

2000 to 2010
In November 2002, State Street announced to acquire global custody business with assets under custody of approximately €2.2 trillion of Deutsche Bank's Global Securities Services (GSS) business for $1.5 billion, subject to adjustment.

In July 2003, HSBC announced the agreement to acquire 82.19% of Korean fund administrator Asset Management Technology (AM TeK) for $12.47 million in cash, which was the biggest fund administrator in South Korea, with $24 billion of assets under administration.

In August 2003, U.S. Bancorp acquired corporate trust business of State Street for $725 million.

In October 2004, Citi acquired ABN AMRO's direct custody, securities clearing, and fund services businesses in selected European and Asian markets for around $50 million.

In November 2005, U.S. Bancorp announced to purchase the corporate trust and institutional custody businesses of Wachovia Corporation.

In July 2006, HSBC announced to acquire Westpac sub-custody operations in Australia and New Zealand for $112.5 million, making the British bank the leading sub-custody and clearing player in Australia and New Zealand.

In July 2007, the merger between Bank of New York and Mellon Financial Corporation had been finalised to create BNY Mellon, which is the largest custodian and asset servicer with more than $18trn in assets under custody and administration at that time.

In July 2007, State Street confirmed to acquire Investors Financial Services for $4.2 billion.

Also, in July 2007, the French bank, BNP Paribas announced an acquisition of a minority stake of 33.4% in the capital of SLIB, which had been a 100% subsidiary of Natixis prior to the acquisition.

In November 2009, J.P. Morgan Chase acquired ANZ's custodian services business, including access to more than 100 clients and US$90.71 billion in assets under custody.

In April 2010, Standard Chartered acquired Barclays African custody business, which had assets under custody of $3.8 billion.

One month later, in May 2010, State Street announced the completion of its acquisition of Intesa Sanpaolo's Securities Services business (ISPSS) for Euro 1.28 billion in cash.

Since 2011
In April 2013, Citi announced to acquire ING Group's Custody and Securities Services Business in Central and Eastern Europe with €110 Billion in assets under custody. In the same month, Standard Chartered acquired custody business in South Africa from Absa Bank.

In February 2018, Butterfield Bank announced to purchase Deutsche Bank's Global Trust Solutions business in the Cayman Islands, Jersey and Guernsey.

In March 2020, Citi announced to buy Royal Bank of Canada's custody business in Australia.

In January 2021, U.S. Bancorp acquired the debt servicing and securities custody services client portfolio of MUFG Union Bank, with approximately 600 client relationships and $320 billion in assets under custody and administration.

In September 2021, State Street announced to acquire Brown Brothers Harriman's Investor Services business, including its custody, accounting, fund administration, global markets and technology services, for $3.5 billion in cash. However, in November 2022, State Street and BBH announced the termination of this transaction.

In January 2022, Standard Chartered announced an agreement to acquire 100% ownership of RBC Investor Services Trust Hong Kong Limited from RBC Investor & Treasury Services, expanding its custodian business to MPF and ORSO schemes trusteeship business in Hong Kong.

Self-Directed Retirement Account Custodians (US)
According to the Internal Revenue Code (IRC) in the US, various retirement accounts such as: Traditional IRAs, Roth IRA, SEP IRA, or 401k plan accounts require that a qualified trustee, or custodian, hold IRA assets on behalf of the IRA owner. The trustee/custodian provides custody of the assets, processes all transactions, maintains other records pertaining to them, files the required IRS reports, issues client statements, helps clients understand the rules and regulations pertaining to certain prohibited transactions, and performs other administrative duties on behalf of the self-directed retirement account owner.

Self-directed retirement account custodians (also known as "self-directed IRA custodians" or "self-directed 401k custodians") should not be confused with a custodian bank, which strictly provides safekeeping for securities. While a self-directed retirement account custodian can provide custody for securities, typically it will specialize in non-security assets, or alternative investments. Examples of alternative investments would be: Real Estate, precious metals, private mortgages, private company stock, oil and gas LPs, horses, and intellectual property. These types of assets require a specialization on the part of the custodian due to the complexity of the documentation required to keep the alternative investments in compliance with the IRC.

Mutual Fund Custodian
A Mutual Fund Custodian refers typically to a custodian bank or trust company (a special type of financial institution regulated like a "bank"), or similar financial institution responsible for holding and safeguarding the securities owned by a mutual fund. A mutual fund's custodian may also act as one or more service agents for the mutual fund such as being the fund accountant, administrator and/or transfer agent which maintains shareholder records and disburses periodic dividends or capital gains, if any, distributed by the fund. The vast majority of funds use a third party custodian as required by SEC regulation to avoid complex rules and requirements about self-custody.

A mutual fund retirement account (IRA, SEP etc.) custodian, however, refers to the plan administrator and recordkeeper such as noted above, which may not necessarily be the same institution providing custody services to the investments of the overall fund.

See also
Central securities depository
Escrow
Custodial account
Securities market participants (United States)

References

Banking
Corporate law